is a Japanese former footballer.

Career statistics

Club

Notes

References

1990 births
Living people
Association football people from Gifu Prefecture
Japanese footballers
Japanese expatriate footballers
Association football defenders
Association football midfielders
Singapore Premier League players
Japan Soccer College players
Albirex Niigata Singapore FC players
FC Gifu players
Japanese expatriate sportspeople in Singapore
Expatriate footballers in Singapore
Japanese expatriate sportspeople in Germany
Expatriate footballers in Germany